Daniel C. Hawkins (born 20 April 1991) is a New Zealand rugby union player who plays for  in the Bunnings NPC. His position is First five-eighth. He has played Super Rugby for the Melbourne Rebels.

References

External links
itsrugby.co.uk profile
 espn.co.uk profile

1991 births
Living people
Melbourne Rebels players
Mitsubishi Sagamihara DynaBoars players
New Zealand rugby union players
Northland rugby union players
People educated at Queen Charlotte College
Rugby union fly-halves
Rugby union players from Picton, New Zealand
Tasman rugby union players